Yana Qaqa (Quechua for the place of transit of an important pass in the principal routes of the Andes; name in the Andes yana black, qaqa rock, "black rock", also spelled Yana Khakha) is a  mountain in the Bolivian Andes. It is located in the Potosí Department, Chayanta Province, Ravelo Municipality. It lies southwest of the village of Wari Pampa (Huari Pampa).

References 

Mountains of Potosí Department